The JS Bach Chamber Music Hall was a temporary structure designed by British-Iraqi architect Zaha Hadid, which was constructed for the Manchester International Festival in 2009. Hadid created the structure within a 425m2 hall inside Manchester Art Gallery to host a series of nine concerts of the solo compositions of JS Bach by international performers Piotr Anderszewski, Jean-Guihen Queyras and Alina Ibragimova.

The construction is a suspended ribbon of translucent, lightweight, synthetic fabric (150 g/m2) articulated by an internal steel structure with hidden internal acoustic panels. Sandy Brown Associates worked as acoustic consultants. Architects' Journal described the construction as "a striking white ribbon in a black box, [that] wraps around itself to create a stage for the performer as well as a space for the audience."

Reaction to the work was largely positive with Anthony Tommasini commenting in the New York Times that "the space was a delight to be in and ... the music sounded up-close and exceptionally vibrant." The Independent described the structure as a "perfect union of sound and space" concluding that it was a "cunning creation of seamless ingenuity providing a curiously reverential setting." The Daily Telegraph described the space as "dazzling". The Guardian however commented "whether it acoustically enhances the performance is impossible to say - one suspects the impact is visual rather than aural".

Following the Manchester festival, the work toured to Amsterdam in 2010 and Abu Dhabi in 2011.

References

External links
Zaha Hadid Architects
Manchester International Festival
Video Interview with Hadid in The Guardian
Information and pictures about the project at the design agency TAGWERC 

Zaha Hadid buildings
Postmodern architecture
Cultural infrastructure completed in 2009